Arbutus × andrachnoides, the hybrid strawberry-tree, is the result of a cross between Arbutus andrachne (eastern strawberry-tree) and Arbutus unedo (Irish strawberry tree). It is a naturally occurring hybrid, but hybrid cultivars have also been created. It has gained the RHS's Award of Garden Merit.

Young specimens of A. × andrachnoides possess the dark bark of A. unedo, but older trees have exfoliations revealing an orangish bark.

The first parental species, A. andrachne, also hybridized with A. canariensis to yield another hybrid, Arbutus × thuretiana Demoly, nothosp. nov..

Description
It is impossible to distinguish Arbutus × andrachnoides individuals from the parent species using traditional botanical methods since they display a complete spectrum of parental traits. DNA testing and statistical methods centered on characterizing the intermediacy of the individual must be used instead.

Gallery

References

andrachnoides
Interspecific plant hybrids
Ornamental plant cultivars
Ornamental trees
Plants described in 1821